Cremaspora is a genus of flowering plants in the family Rubiaceae. It is the only genus in the tribe Cremasporeae. It was described by George Bentham in 1849. The genus is widespread across much of sub-Saharan Africa from Senegal to Tanzania and south to Mozambique and Zimbabwe, in addition to Madagascar, Comoros, and Cape Verde. There are, however, only two currently recognized species.

Species
 Cremaspora thomsonii Hiern - Nigeria, Central African Republic, Cameroon, Gabon 
 Cremaspora triflora (Thonn.) K.Schum.
Cremaspora triflora subsp. comorensis (Baill.) Verdc. - Comoros, Madagascar
Cremaspora triflora subsp. confluens (K.Schum.) Verdc. - Kenya, Tanzania, Malawi, Mozambique 
Cremaspora triflora subsp. triflora - Cape Verde, tropical Africa

References

External links
Cremaspora in the World Checklist of Rubiaceae

Rubiaceae genera
Cremasporeae
Flora of Africa